Pyeongtaek Station is the main train station serving the city of Pyeongtaek, South Korea. It is on the Gyeongbu Line and is also served by Seoul Subway Line 1. It is not a KTX station, but the KTX stops here and there is a ticket counter. There are a number of large department stores, restaurants, and a movie theater located in the subway station. The cinema is located on the 8th floor and is a CJ CGV multi-screen facility with a 3-D screen. On the 3rd floor there are Baskin Robbins, Starbucks, and a large food court featuring a Lotteria fast food restaurant. The station is also located in the middle of the city of Pyeongtaek and many stores and restaurants are outside the station.

There is a large bus stop in front of the station. The following buses stop in front of the station, as of May 2014: 1-1, 2, 2-2, 3, 9, 13, 14, 15, 16, 17, 20, 50, 80, 81, 90, 91, 94, 98, 100, and 110-2. The 1-1, 2, and 2-2 buses go to Songtan. The 50 bus goes to Anseong.

Images

References

Seoul Metropolitan Subway stations
Railway stations in Gyeonggi Province
Railway stations in Korea opened in 1905
Metro stations in Pyeongtaek